Feminism in South Korea is the origin and history of the movement of feminism or women's rights in South Korea.

Women's suffrage in South Korea was included in Article 11 of the national constitution in 1948. The constitution says "all citizens shall be equal before the law, and there shall be no discrimination in political, economic, social or cultural life on account of sex, religion or social status." The feminist or women's rights movement in South Korea is quite recent compared to first wave and second-wave feminism in the Western world. While drastic changes in the workplace and economy have been implemented as a result of the industrialization of the economy and globalization, there has been less change in cultural values in South Korean society.

Background 
Along with history of a royal monarch, strict hierarchical division and patriarchal family structure, Korean society had maintained the social structure that justified unfair social treatment and distribution of unequal role. At the center of this phenomenon, Confucianism is deeply placed under people's mind. For instance, Confucianism apparently had required women to obey the men; from the journal "Women's Status in South Korea" by Marian Lief Palley quoted the tenet about women's obedience and translated as "to the father when young; to the husband when married; and to the son in old age." Confucianism's core principle emphasizes the wife's obedience to her husband. Combined with Confucianism's emphasis on relationship among people rather than individual freedom, gender discrimination was justified which not only men but also women themselves recognize subordinate nature under this Confucianist system unconsciously. In fact, the "custom" of "tradition" Confucian group often asserted during the discussion with feminist movement was derived from old Japanese civil code determined during colonial era. Although the start of this "custom" supposed to be viewed improper to keep up after the decolonization in Korean stance, similar culture code under Korea and Japan dissolved into Korean culture and perceived as it derived from our ancestors. Despite the fact that the root of this custom arouse a question of validity to conserve it,  this system of thoughts was deeply settled in general society that it made hard for people to realize the fact that society only favors certain group of people.

This worn-out paradigm had suddenly been challenged due to sudden modernization of society. With vast economic growth through rapid industrialization and modernization, the role of men and women took a new aspect. With advent of democracy and capitalism, women started to do work in public space, participated in political activity which their suffrage was legitimized in the 1948 Constitution, and gained more opportunity to pursue higher education including college and university degree of education. However, cultural growth does not coincide well as the economic growth.

Under this seemingly improved condition, long entrenched gender discrepancy was held even more devious ways. Behind the scene, gender discrimination was prevalent without any conscious questioning about its validity upon moral aspect. Although the social perspective no longer externally prohibit women from doing economic activity, poor working condition, low wage comparable to those of male workers, and sexual harassment taken place at work cite discouraged women workers. Moreover, these issues are not really discussed openly within society's members or often overlooked as a small problem compare to other social issues such as democratization of government or human right issues among Korean society. Politically paralyzed, those who were involved and suffered from this gender incident could not expect a public solution or improvement. Instead, religion and sisterhood within women in same classes console their sadness shown in case of Song Hyo Soon introduced in journal "WOMEN, WORK AND THEOLOGY IN KOREA" by Soon Hwa Sun. Political influence of women also depicted differently from what the Constitution of the Republic of Korea stated. During the era when women's suffrage was officially included in the Constitution, National Assembly of Korea was composed of only 6 women member out of 299 members serve there, and had not appointed any female cabinet ministers up to date. Unlike the ideal statement of article 11, clause 1 of the Constitution of the Republic of Korea where it states that "all citizens are equal before the law and that there shall not be discrimination in political, economic, social, or culture life on account of sex, religion, or social status," substantial changes for female's fair participation of politics had not yet achieved. Higher education of women also did not guarantee an improvement in job opportunity. Beside certain career commonly pursued by women including nurse, or hairdressers, job opportunities were not equally given to women; especially to women college/university graduates who were excluded from companies' and work cites' employment scope. To rectify these unfair incidents recurring in Korean society, women's rights movement enlighten people to recognize the issue of equity and worker exploitation.

Minjung Undong
While there are women's rights groups today in South Korea that were founded before the second World War and post 1945, most of these groups did not focus solely on women's rights until the mid-1980s. The contemporary feminist movement in South Korea today can be traced back to the minjung undong or mass people's movement of South Korea. As the minjung movement grew, so did the focus on women's rights. The exploitation of women labor in factories during South Korea's “economic miracle” gave the minjung movement a women's issue to focus on. The core of the minjung movement was thought to be poor rural and urban women. In the 1970s, the feminist movement in Korea was influenced by women's movement in the Western world, particularly in the United States.  However, in the 1980s, the birth of radical women's organizations began to resist American feminist influence by concentrating on broad human rights issues and reunification instead of gender equality.

The minjung undong movement began as a response to Japanese colonialism of South Korea and subsequently continued through 1961–1992. The movement fought for the freedom of the oppressed labor forces of Korea and was championed by students, workers, peasants, and intellectuals. At the same time, minjung feminism grew from this movement.  During the years 1961–1979 or General Park Chung Hee’s regime, women factory workers in South Korea, or yo’ kong, were girls from the countryside who worked in factories for electronics, textiles, garments, plastics, and food processing. They suffered from poor working conditions, such as living in dormitories where mattresses were shared between two shifts of workers and working in factories where a single floor was divided into two. They were also paid low wages and were sexually harassed. During this period, the work done by the oppressed labor forces built the foundation for South Korea’s later economic development. This period gave South Korea the reputation for having “the world’s longest work week and highest rate of industrial accidents”. For the first time in South Korean history in 1972, a woman was elected as president of the democratic union movement and kept the movement going for six more years before it was finally shut down by the government. The Garment Makers Union or Chunggye Pibok Union represented 20,000 women working at Seoul's Peace Market until it was also shut down in the 1980s by General Chun Doo Hwan. South Korea's first female diplomat Hong Sook-ja entered the 1987 election, becoming the first female presidential candidate.

By the mid-1980s, the women's movement gained traction thanks to female involvement in the labor and student movements. The 1980s was a period of political turmoil and reform in South Korea. The Institute of Women's Research was created at Ewha University which was the first university for women in South Korea. In 1985, there was a national women's rally with the theme “Women’s Movement in Unity with National Democratic Minjung Movement”. Then in 1986, spurred by the rape and torture of female labor organizer Kwon In Suk by the hands of police in Buchon, women rallied together to form The Korean Women's Associations United (KWAU) which was made up of 33 different organizations (peasant, religious, environmental). KWAU's participation in protests eventually forced General Chun Doo Hwan to step down whose successor then implemented direct presidential elections.

By 1987, women made up 55% of the paid workforce. The service industry had the highest percentage of women (60%) compared to manufacturing (40%) and office workers (38%). However, sex worker jobs make up 30% of women employed in the service industry. The Korean Women Workers Association (KWWA) formed in 1987 in response to gender discrimination in the workforce and fights for gender equality in South Korea. It was essential in continuing the fight for women's rights following democratic and political reform in South Korea. Even now, the KWWA fights for an 8-hour work day, higher wages, maternity protection, an end to sexual discrimination in the workplace, and an end to sexual violence against women in Korea. Chapters of the KWWA are in Seoul, Pusan, Buchon, Inchon, Changwon-Masan, and Kwangju. In response to workplace discrimination, the Korean Women's Association for Democracy and Sisterhood was founded by women office workers. These female workers fought against both the pay gap and sexist errands (such as carrying coffee and getting cigarettes for their male coworkers and superiors).

Other issues for women workers in South Korea include the harsh reality of precarious and irregular work. One company that pushed irregular work was KORAIL, which used third-party companies to high irregular workers, allowed the sexual harassment of female workers, and employed discriminatory hiring tactics, became the target. To support women who experienced the drawbacks of irregular work, unions such as the Korean Women's Trade Union (KWTU) and Korean Solidarity Against Precarious Work (KSPW) grew. Significant protests and demonstrations came out of the KTX train attendants fight for equality and better treatment, which resulted in many of them getting fired, but as of 2018, they have been re-hired. Women also experienced discrimination from majority male unions, which reaffirmed the need for women to have unions and organizations that center their needs.

The minjung feminist movement was vital in bringing to light the crimes committed against women in the military. It provided support for comfort women survivors by establishing groups. Comfort women survivors in Korea and other countries such as the Philippines, Taiwan, and other Japanese-occupied territories banded together with the Korean Council, the Korean Sexual Violence Relief Center, and the Korean Women's Associations United in order to submit testimony to the Human Rights Commission of the United Nations in 1993. Their testimony also included their demands to end violence against women committed in the military and during war.

Direction of feminist activities
There are significant differences between the “reformist” and “radical” feminist movements.

Reformist feminist movements in South Korea concentrate on changing women's roles in society. These movements are more similar to  mainstream feminist movements in America. Their methods include lobbying, influencing decision makers, and drafting legislation. They are usually in support of the government of South Korea. These groups are said to be more mainstream and are made up of women from the middle-class who speak both Korean and English. Most of these groups are affiliated with the Council of Korean Women's Organizations (CKWO).

Other mainstream reformist organizations include:

 Young Women's Christian Association (YWCA) established in 1922 
 Korean Center for Family Law established in 1954 
 Business and Professional Women (BPW)
 Korean Association of University Women (KAUW)
 Korean National Mother's Association (KNMA) established in 1958, and has about 40,000-50,000 members
 Korean Federation of Housewives’ Clubs (KFHC) established in 1963, and has about 180,000 members.

KNMA and KFHC support changes in the Family Law and the Equal Employment Opportunity Act. The Equal Employment Opportunity Act was passed in April 1988 and includes equality for women in job placement, promotions, retirement, job training, and compensation for maternity leave. Radical groups have criticized the law by stating that it does not have a “mechanism for implementation”. Reformist groups have referred to the act as a first step and a sign of encouragement for reforms to come. The efforts of reformist groups to change the Family Law of South Korea culminated in the change in child-custody arrangements in 1991. The rule that children always had to enter the father's custody after divorce was changed. The inheritance system was also changed to all children sharing equally in inheritance regardless of gender.

Radical feminist movements in South Korea focus on women's rights as human rights. Many of these groups were formed during the late 1980s, as opposed to the older reformist groups. They focus on issues such as reunification with North Korea and the prevention of torture of prisoners. The term “radical” does not refer to support for radical changes in women's roles. Their methods include strikes, marches, and public demonstrations. It can be argued that the word ‘radical’ is used because of the context of Korean society, which is far more oppressive and conservative than Western society. The radical groups are also younger than the reformist groups and are made up of often well-educated, middle-class women who prefer to speak only Korean. They usually affiliate with the KWAU.

Examples of radical organizations are:

 Women's Society for Democracy (WSD), established in 1987 
 Women's Hotline established in 1983
 Women's Newspaper established in 1986
 Korean Women's Worker Association
 Korean Catholic Farmers
 Women's Party

The Women's Society for Democracy believes that human rights issues take precedence over issues of sexual equality. The Women's Hotline organization in Seoul addresses rape, prostitution, workplace discrimination, and domestic abuse. The radical women's rights groups criticized the Equal Employment Opportunity Act passed in 1988.

An important organization that is not affiliated with either the reformist or radical groups in South Korea is the Korean League of Women Voters. Recently, its activities have increased voter participation among women.

The terms reformist and radical are, at most, general classifications of the feminist movements in South Korea. Sharp divides exist along socialism and Marxist ideologies as well as stances towards migrant rights and transgender inclusion. Social feminists in South Korea concentrate on the effects of the patriarchy and the gender issues women face. They have a strong influence on women's studies in South Korea today. In contrast, Marxist feminists focus on the class divide and concentrate more on labor issues. Both socialist feminist and Marxist feminist organizations have combined to form the Alternative Culture and Research Center for Korean Women's Studies.

Radical feminism in South Korea 

As of 2018, the rise of Korean radical feminism can be characterized by several key incidents in Korean feminist history, starting from the perpetual debate between Korean men who claim to be suffering from reverse sexism due to Korea's mandatory military service for males, to the recent acquittal of a rising political star against sexual harassment allegations which was widely regarded to have dealt a significant blow against the country's #MeToo movement. Most recently, there have been several radical feminist demonstrations against misogynistic practices. The most prominent of these are the widespread use of spy cams in women's bathrooms and the Free the corset movement. The “Escape the Corset” or "Free the Corset" movement consists of mainly women who seek to challenge the high beauty standards in South Korean society. To protest the beauty standards they find damaging, South Korean women choose to boycott makeup, hair dye and cosmetic procedures, a billion-dollar industry in the country. These demonstrations have received a large amount of support, where tens of thousands of young Korean women have come out to protest the unfair treatment against women and the biased standards against women.

The most recent, the Hyehwa Station Protest in October 2018, was the fifth such group protest against spy cameras and gender specific crimes. These demonstrations were characterized by the youthfulness of the crowd as well as their tendency to practice, limiting those who are able to join in the movement to women who were assigned female at birth, but including trans men. These tactics have been met with mixed feelings, with one male reporter stating "I could not be there to interview anyone although I am sympathetic to the cause". In addition, President Moon Jae-in had stated during a July 2018 cabinet meeting that "Things like this bitterness among women will only be resolved when we are able to make them feel that we are especially respectful of the senses of shame and dignity associated with women’s sexuality.” Many women have since argued that President Moon is incapable of addressing the issue of misogyny if he continues to regard women's demonstrations as an expression of "bitterness." fueling an already divisive subject. Some men's rights activist groups have started counter-protests of their own, advocating "guilty until proven innocent," and "release 10 criminals rather than charging one innocent man." These demonstrations are currently ongoing, with the next demonstrations planned for sometime early 2019.

While the root of radical South Korean Feminism can be traced to a website called Megalia, one of the largest incidents that brought the radical feminist movement to a head was an incident at a women's bathroom near Gangnam station in 2016. A man had been hiding in a women's bathroom and laid in wait for hours for a woman to come in with the express purpose of killing whoever came in. He has publicly admitted that he had specifically killed her because he hated all women for “belittling him”. However, Korean police at the time treated the case as an isolated incident caused by a mentally unstable man. This sparked outrage and controversy throughout Seoul, as thousands of women congregated around the area to mourn the victim, and the lack of response from the police. Simultaneous “men’s rights” demonstrators arrived as counter-protestors, stating that more men died than women due to military service, this was epitomized by the 'pink elephant incident', where a man wearing a pink elephant body suit argued against 'reverse sexism', stating that the Disney movie Zootopia was a movie about reverse sexism. While he was booed out of the demonstration, men's rights groups took video footage of this incident and came up with the cry “stop violence against men.” Zootopia director Byron Howard has since publicly tweeted that Zootopia was never intended to promote hatred or "used as a political statement in support of misogyny". This incident triggered a nationwide debate on whether mental illness or deep-rooted misogyny was to blame for crimes targeting women, and served as a trigger for several women to join the #MeToo movement in support of women who had suffered from misogynistic crimes.

Attitudes towards feminism in contemporary South Korea
Many scholars have noted a surge in interest towards feminism throughout South Korean society over recent years, this surge is often referred to as the ‘feminism reboot’. Both the Korean MeToo movement and the Gangnam murder case have been accredited with playing an important role in catalysing the growth of interest towards feminism within South Korea. The Post-It note protest was organised following the Gangnam murder case, where a young woman was murdered by a man in a public bathroom close to Gangnam station, allegedly motivated by a hatred towards women. The Post-It note protest gave women a space to, anonymously, speak out against the misogyny and high rates of violence against women that remains prevalent in South Korean society. The MeToo movement, ignited in January 2018 with the initial accusation made by Suh Ji-Hyeon, inspired many women to come forward about their personal experiences with sexual harassment and violence. Although through these events some people began to receive feminism more positively, others continued to oppose the feminist movement and the voices that came forward in response to the MeToo movement, under the belief that women are no longer being discriminated against.

Despite feminism gaining more interest amongst the public over recent years, it is clear that there is still a lack of support for the feminist movement throughout South Korea. Many continue to label feminists, and the actions of such young women, as ‘pathological’ or ‘crazy’. In addition, scholars have also suggested that feminism continues to be synonymous with female chauvinism and ‘man-hating’ within South Korea.

South Korean radical feminist online communities, such as Womad and Megalia, have undoubtedly played a role in the formation of such perceptions of feminism. Womad, a particularly infamous radical feminist site, has been claimed to be “the strongest and most extreme route of South Korean feminism”. Discourses on these sites have often been criticised for their posts which mock and revile men and claims of committing various crimes, e.g., the abortion of a male baby. Lee Na-mi, a researcher at a psychological analysis centre, during an interview, made clear her worries about how such discourses could result in the South Korean feminist movement being distorted or perceived wrongly. San E, a famous Korean rapper, has often publicly expressed such perceptions of feminism, for example he claimed that “Womad is poison. Feminist, no. You’re a mental illness” at a concert.

Hostility towards feminism has often resulted in many South Korean celebrities being met with backlash for expressing even the smallest amount of support for the feminist movement. Red Velvet member Irene was flooded with comments and messages across social media from angry fans after expressing that she had read the feminist novel, Kim Ji Young, Born 1982. Popular Korean actress, Moon Ga-young, has also received large amounts of backlash for speaking out about feminism and criticizing incidents of misogyny in Korean society. More recently, a member of the South Korean Olympic archery team, An San, suffered extreme backlash because of claims that her short hair and the fact that she attends a women's only college. These incidents of hostility towards even the slightest display of feminism shows the prevalence of negative attitudes towards the feminist movement within South Korean society.

Political status of Korean women
Not only has the social status of women been neglected, but the political status of women was not fully approved by law. As South Korea democratized, the range of women's activity in public space broadened. South Korean women experienced pushback through the devaluation of female activity and legal position. While Korean women realized how poorly they had treated under Confucian family system and society, Korean women were especially in need of diminished influence on family's politics, right on property and children custody. To achieve such equity, women's right movement raise the voice to abolish the family law.

Within the family law, the fundamental idea was depended on the Confucian belief that the family-head, who is oldest male member among the family, has the authority on ruling his family and family members. The authorities given to family-head were including inclusion of family member when marriage of male member of family occur, child custody and property ownership when divorce happened, and to sustain his family line while female family line is not included. Besides, the law even states unfair succession of property to first male child. With legislation of these laws, women underwent hardship of composing a family under absence of husband or male family member in case of divorce, remarriage etc. and of gaining a financial support from family either in succession or property division during divorce.

To make this happen, numerous attempts to eradicate these laws were held by feminists and these attempts made slow but firm change over time. By 1962, the first revision on family law was made. The traditional huge sized family could now be separated and re-arranged as a new family with fewer members with their own rights to decide where to live and work. Although it did not directly make a positive effect on women's law, the revision contains its meaning on change of people's perspective over social structure. On the following revisions in 1977 and 1989, substantial changes were made and approved by law. Since the 1989 revision, property division upon divorce and succession prone to male were prohibited; parental right was fairly shared by mother and father that introduces the right to meet the children after divorce. Although many improvements have been made, the family-head issue and exogamy of same surname or ancestry still remained to be changed. Without rectifying them, women couldn't achieve the position as one of the family's representative and freedom to create or re-create social relationship under law(e.g. remarriage, adoption, etc.).

In 2005, considering the social changes over diverse family structure and citizens' broad participation on the issue through internet including the support from professionals, the government and feminist movement finally agreed on a consent to abolish the entire concept of family-head system and dongsung dongpon – an institution prohibiting marriage between members who share the same surname and ancestral seat – from the Constitution. It is a remarkable achievement that epitomizes the feminist movement's influence. Not only it is a meaningful achievement improving Korean women's social and political position, but also it is regarded as an "effort to decolonize its (Korean) law and society."

In 2013, South Korea outlawed marital rape.

The government of South Korea criminalized abortion in the 1953 Criminal Code in all circumstances. This South Korean abortion law was amended by the Maternal and Child Health Law of 1973, which permitted a physician to perform an abortion if the pregnant woman or her spouse suffered from certain hereditary or communicable diseases, if the pregnancy resulted from rape or incest, or if continuing the pregnancy would jeopardize the woman's health. Any physician who violated the law was punished by two years' imprisonment. Self-induced abortions were illegal, and punishable by a fine or imprisonment. The Constitutional Court on 11 April 2019 ruled the abortion law unconstitutional and ordered the law's revision by the end of 2020.

See also
 Gender inequality in South Korea
 Idaenam
 Sim Sang-jung
 Wednesday demonstration
 Women in South Korea

References

 
South Korea
Progressivism in South Korea